The Mercedes-Benz 4G-Tronic transmission was produced from 1979 to 1996 in W4A 028, W4A 040 (both type 722.3), W4A 020 (type 722.4), and W5A 030 (type 722.5) variants.

Abstract
The 4G-Tronic transmission is a hydraulically operated four speed automatic without lock-up that replaced the similarly designed W3A 040, W3B 050, and W4B 025 family of automatic transmissions with the introduction of the W126 S-Class in 1979. In some models it is calibrated to move off in second gear to reduce "creeping" and provide a smoother ride, selecting 1st only if the selector is in "2" or in case of abrupt acceleration. Other calibrations have the transmission rest in 2nd gear and kick down to 1st as soon as the accelerator is touched but before the throttle is opened. In some V8 installations a small control unit activates the kick down solenoid when the brake pedal is released so that the car moves off in 1st gear. Other attributes of this transmission include a 2-3 shift delay when the engine is cold in order to speed up catalyst warm-up. 4th gear is a 1:1 ratio. Controls are all mechanical and pneumatic, except for the kickdown solenoid and 2-3 upshift delay solenoid on some models.

In some markets a W-S (Winter - Standard / Sport) switch was provided on the shifter. Activating S mode changes a linkage which effectively shortens the throttle pressure bowden cable. This causes later, higher RPM shifts and on some models a move off in 1st gear instead of 2nd. On V8 models a B (Brake) range is available on the shifter. This activates the kickdown solenoid, forcing the transmission to shift down to 1st sooner for increased engine braking. A hydraulically activated piston prevents shifting into Reverse when the car is moving forward.

Models from 1990 and earlier allow for push starting the engine. They are fitted with a secondary fluid pump, driven by the transmission output shaft. When the vehicle is rolling at 20 mph shifting from Neutral to the 2 range will couple power to the engine. The secondary pump and thus the push starting facility was eliminated for the 1991 model year.

The W4A 040 and the W4A 020 were used until mid-1996. The W4A 028 variant was used for off-road applications (RWD and 4X4). The W5A 030 is basically the same transmission with an additional electrically controlled 5th gear overdrive section attached to the main body in a separate housing; it was available as an extra charge option. All 4G-Tronics were succeeded by the more modern and economic 5G-Tronic (Type 722.6) transmission that features an integrated 5th gear overdrive ratio, torque converter lock-up and fully electronic control.

It is considered by enthusiasts to be one of the most reliable transmissions ever built by Mercedes-Benz with some examples exceeding 300,000 miles of service.

Specifications

Basic concept
For this W4A-models 4 forward gears using 8 main components show economic equivalence with the direct predecessor. 5 forward gears out of 11 main components and the need of two housings and two different controls turn out the W5A 030 as the least economically designed automatic transmission ever manufactured for passenger cars. Obviously a transition solution: the direct successor, launched in 1996, requires 9 main components, one housing and one control.

Gear ratios

Applications
The 4G-Tronic has been used in many Mercedes-Benz cars.

W4A 028 (Type 722.3)
 1990-1995 G-Class 463.

W4A 040 I+II (Type 722.3)
 1981-1989 R107 and C107
 1989-1996 R129

 1985-1996 W124
 1979-1991 W126
 1991-1996 W140
 1985-1993 W201
 1995-1996 W210

W4A 020 (Type 722.4)

 1985-1996 W124
 1982-1993 W201
 1993-1996 W202
 1995-1996 W210

W5A 030 (Type 722.5)
 1990-1996 W124
 1991-1996 W140
 1995-1996 W210
 1990-1996 R129

See also

 List of Daimler AG transmissions

Notes

References

External links
 Mercedes 722.3 & 722.4 Technical Overview

4